Young Lady Chatterley II is a 1985 American softcore pornographic film directed Alan Roberts and starring Harlee McBride, Sybil Danning, and Adam West. It is the sequel to the 1977 film Young Lady Chatterley.

Premise
Cynthia, the new Lady Chatterley, is feeling neglected by her husband and while he is away tries to amuse herself with Thomas the gardener, but is always interrupted by visitors.

Cast
 Harlee McBride as Cynthia Chatterley
 Sybil Danning as Judith Grimmer
 Adam West as Arthur Bohart Jr.
 Mike Reynolds as Howard Beechum III
 Wendy Barry as Sybil the maid
 Monique Gabrielle as Eunice the maid
 Brandy Lyne as Wanda the maid

References

External links

1985 films
1980s English-language films
1980s erotic films
American sequel films
American erotic films
Films based on Lady Chatterley's Lover
1980s American films